The Pilgrim River is a  river in Portage Township, Houghton County, Michigan, in the United States. The river flows near the Portage Lake Golf Course and empties into the Keweenaw Waterway, which connects to Lake Superior.

In 2010, the Pilgrim River Watershed Project formed with the goal to secure easements along the river to keep the river accessible for non-motorized recreation.

See also
List of rivers of Michigan

References

External links
Michigan  Streamflow Data from the USGS

Rivers of Michigan
Rivers of Houghton County, Michigan
Tributaries of Lake Superior